Mamulan Rural District is a rural district (dehestan) in Mamulan District, Pol-e Dokhtar County, Lorestan Province, Iran. At the 2006 census, its population was 3,825, in 854 families.  The rural district has 35 villages.

References 

Rural Districts of Lorestan Province
Pol-e Dokhtar County